USS Strong (DD-467), was a  and the first ship of the United States Navy to be named after Rear Admiral James H. Strong (1814–1882), who rammed the Confederate ironclad  during the Battle of Mobile Bay, receiving a commendation and promotion to captain.

Strong was laid down on 30 April 1941 at Bath, Maine, by Bath Iron Works, launched on 17 May 1942 sponsored by Mrs Hobart Olson and commissioned on 7 August 1942.

History
After completing her shakedown cruise and working-up, Strong sailed on 15 October with a convoy to San Juan, Puerto Rico returning to Norfolk, Virginia, on the 27th and departing two days later for New York. On 13 November, she sailed with convoy UGS-2 bound for North African ports. She arrived at Casablanca on 29 November and returned to New York with convoy GUF-2. Following a yard availability period, 11 to 26 December, the destroyer moved to Norfolk.

Strong sailed on 27 December 1942; transited the Panama Canal; refueled at Bora Bora, Society Islands; and arrived at Noumea on 27 January 1943. Strong then escorted a convoy northwest for two days and was relieved to return to Nouméa. On 1 February, she and  escorted a convoy bound for Espiritu Santo, New Hebrides. She sailed from there on 5 February for the Solomon Islands and patrolled off Guadalcanal until the 13th when she joined Task Force 67 (TF 67) composed of four cruisers and their destroyer screen.

The task force devoted most of the next month to patrol duty in waters in and around the Solomons. The force then resumed patrol duties in the Solomons. The target was illuminated by her searchlight and assessed to be the Japanese submarine . Strong and the destroyer  opened fire, claiming three  hits. The submarine, settled by the stern and sank.

Strong, with TF 18, accompanied three destroyers minelayers to Blackett Strait, between Kolombangara and Arundel Island and mined it in the early morning hours of 7 May. The next morning, four Japanese destroyers sailed around Kolombangara strait and into the minefield. One was sunk, two were damaged and later sunk by aircraft, the fourth was badly damaged but managed to escape.

On the night of 12–13 May, Strong and the task force bombarded Kolombangara, then commenced escort and patrol duty off Guadalcanal. On the afternoon of 16 June, she was halfway between Guadalcanal and Tulagi when a flight of approximately 15 Japanese dive bombers attacked the American ships. Strong was the closest ship to the bombers as they approached in a shallow dive and she claimed three shot down.

On the morning of 5 July, American forces landed at Rice Anchorage. Strong and TF 18 were to support the landings by shelling Vila-Stanmore, Enogai, and Bairoko. Strong and Nicholas entered Bairoko Harbor to search ahead of the main force and shelled the harbour from 00:30 to 00:40. Nine minutes later, a torpedo hit her port side. Japanese gunners on Enogai beach spotted the ships, illuminated them with star shells, and opened fire with high explosive rounds. O'Bannon began a counter-battery fire at the enemy guns that were hitting Strong and Chevalier who was forced to withdraw.

Strong began to settle rapidly with a 40° to 60° list to starboard, she broke in half just prior to sinking and several of her depth charges exploded.  Forty-six men were killed and she was struck from the Navy list on 15 July 1943.

Wreck discovered
In mid-February 2019, the research vessel  located the wreck in  meters of water. The ship is well broken up with the heavily damaged forward part of the ship resting on its port side in a compact debris field that contains the rest of the ship, including her fairly well-preserved wheelhouse, torpedo tubes, propellers and propeller shafts, 5" guns, boilers, and at least one intact funnel.

Honors
Strong received two battle stars for World War II service.

References

External links 
 USS Strong website at Destroyer History Foundation
        navsource.org: USS Strong
  hazegray.org: USS Strong

 

Strong (DD-467)
Ships built in Bath, Maine
Shipwrecks in the Solomon Sea
1942 ships
Strong (DD-467)
Maritime incidents in July 1943
Shipwreck discoveries by Paul Allen
2019 archaeological discoveries